Fictional characters found in the Charlie's Angels franchise include:

In television

1976 series

Characters in the 1976–81 television series Charlie's Angels include:
 Kelly Garrett (Jaclyn Smith) (1976–1981, 2003, 2019) and young Kelly (Tonya Crowe) (1976; season 1)
 Sabrina Duncan (Kate Jackson) (1976–1979)
 Jill Munroe (Farrah Fawcett) (1976–1977, regular) (1978–1980, guest star 6 episodes)
 Kris Munroe (Cheryl Ladd) (1977–1981) and young Kris (Jordan Ladd) (1978; season 3)
 Tiffany Welles (Shelley Hack) (1979–1980)
 Julie Rogers (Tanya Roberts) (1980–1981)
 John Bosley (David Doyle) (1976–1981)
 Charles "Charlie" Townsend (John Forsythe) (voice) (1976–1981, 2000–2003) 
 Scott Woodville (David Ogden Stiers) (Charlie's majordomo in the pilot episode)

2011 series 
Characters in the 2011 reboot series Charlie's Angels include:
 Kate Prince (Annie Ilonzeh)
 Abigail "Abby" Simpson (Rachael Taylor)
 Eve French (Minka Kelly) and young Eve (Taylor Blackwell) 
 Gloria Martinez (Nadine Velazquez) and young Gloria (Anahi Artica)
 Zoe Sinclair / Oswald (Peyton List)  (Villain)
 John Bosley (Ramon Rodriguez)
 Charles "Charlie" Townsend (Victor Garber) (voice)
 Samantha Masters (Erica Durance)
 Ray Goodson (Isaiah Mustafa)
 Victor Simpson (John Terry)

Others spin-off series 
Characters that would have been in Angels '89 include:
 Connie Bates (Claire Yarlett)
 Pam Ryan (Karen Kopins) 
 Trisha Lawrence (Sandra Canning)
 Bernie Colter (Téa Leoni)

Characters that appeared in the Telemundo Network version called Ángeles in 1998 include: 
 Elena Sanchez (Sandra Vidal)
 Adriana Vega (Patricia Manterola) 
 Gina Navarro (Cole Pitman)

Characters that appeared in the German version called Wilde Engel from 2003 to 2005 include: 
 Christina "Chris" Rabe (Birgit Stauber) (2002-2003)
 Franziska Borgardt (Susann Uplegger) (2002-2003)
 Lena Heitmann (Eva Habermann) (2002-2003)
 Rebecca (Vanessa Petruo) (2005)
 Ida (Tanja Wenzel) (2005)
 Aiko (Zora Holt) (2005)

Characters that appeared in the Taiwanese version called Asian Charlie's Angels in 2004 include: 
 Betty (Qu Ying)
 Cindy (Kelly Lin)
 Annabelle (Annie Wu)
 Angie (Christy Chung)

In film 
Characters in the first and second installments in the film series, Charlie's Angels (2000) and the sequel, Charlie's Angels: Full Throttle, include:
 Natalie Cook (Cameron Diaz)
 Dylan Sanders (Drew Barrymore)
 Alexandra "Alex" Munday (Lucy Liu)
 Thin Man / Anthony (Crispin Glover)
 Jason Gibbons (Matt LeBlanc)
 Pete Komisky (Luke Wilson)
 John Bosley (Bill Murray)
 Eric Knox (Sam Rockwell)
 Roger Corwin (Tim Curry)
 Vivian Wood (Kelly Lynch)
 Jimmy Bosley (Bernie Mac)
 Madison Lee (Demi Moore)
 Seamus O'Grady (Justin Theroux)

Characters in the third installment in the film series, Charlie's Angels (2019), include:
 Sabina Wilson (Kristen Stewart)
 Elena Houghlin (Naomi Scott)
 Jane Kano (Ella Balinska)
 Rebekah "Bosley" (Elizabeth Banks)
 Edgar "Bosley" Dessange (Djimon Hounsou)
 John Bosley (Patrick Stewart)
 Charles "Charlie" Townsend (Robert Clotworthy) (voice)
 "Charlie", head of agency (Jaclyn Smith) (reveal)
 Ingrid (Hannah Hoekstra)
 The Saint (Luis Gerardo Méndez)
 Langston (Noah Centineo)
 Alexander Brock (Sam Claflin)
 Hodak (Jonathan Tucker)

References

 
Lists of fictional characters